is a town located in Mie Prefecture, Japan. , the town had an estimated population of 15,077 in 7876 households and a population density of 59 persons per km².

Geography
Kihoku is located in southeastern the Kii Peninsula in southern Mie Prefecture, facing the Pacific Ocean. Kihoku is surrounded by river, sea, and mountain, and has a beautiful setting.

Neighboring municipalities
Mie Prefecture
Owase
Ōdai
Taiki
Nara Prefecture
Kamikitayama

Climate
Kihoku has a Humid subtropical climate (Köppen Cfa) characterized by warm summers and cool winters with light to no snowfall.

Demographics
Per Japanese census data, the population of Kihoku has decreased steadily over the past 40 years.

History
The area of present-day Kihoku was part of ancient Shima Province, but was transferred to Kii Province in 1582. During this time, large-scale forestry projects were begun.  After the Meiji restoration, the area became part of Mie Prefecture. The village of Nagashima was established with the creation of the modern municipalities system on April 1, 1889 and was raised to town status in 1899. It changed its name to Kii-Nagashima in 1970. The town of Kihoku was established on October 11, 2005 by the merger of the towns of Kii-Nagashima and neighboring Miyama.

Government
Kihoku has a mayor-council form of government with a directly elected mayor and a unicameral town council of 16 members. Kihoku, collectively with the city of Owase, contributes two members to the Mie Prefectural Assembly. In terms of national politics, the town is part of Mie 4th district of the lower house of the Diet of Japan.

Economy
Kihoku serves as a commercial center for the surrounding region. Commercial fishing and forestry are the major employers. A well-known product of the former town of Miyama is saury sushi because of the large local catch of saury. At Kihoku, there is the static inverter plant of Kii Channel HVDC system.

Education
Kihoku has nine public elementary schools and four public middle schools operated by the town government. The town does not have a high school.

Transportation

Railway
 JR Tōkai – Kisei Main Line
 -  -  -

Highway
 Kisei Expressway
 }

Local attractions 
A portion of the Sacred Sites and Pilgrimage Routes in the Kii Mountain Range, a UNESCO World Heritage Site is located within Kihoku.

Notable people
Yoshihiko Wada, artist

References

External links

Kihoku official website 

Towns in Mie Prefecture
Populated coastal places in Japan
Kihoku, Mie